Martin Buchwieser (born May 28, 1989) is a German professional ice hockey forward who is signed with Löwen Frankfurt, a member of the DEL2.

Playing career 
Buchwieser came through the youth ranks of SC Riessersee, before joining EHC München in 2008. He earned promotion to Germany's top-flight DEL with the team in 2010 and during that particular season already logged his first DEL minutes with Augsburger Panther.

After his third season with EHC München, his first as captain in 2012–13, Buchwieser was released as a free agent and signed by Adler Mannheim on a two-year contract on April 12, 2013. He won the 2015 German championship with Mannheim and during the offseason was traded to fellow DEL side Hamburg Freezers in May 2016. Later that month, the Freezers folded, Buchwieser became a free agent and was picked up by another DEL team, ERC Ingolstadt, a couple of days later.

References

External links

1989 births
Living people
Adler Mannheim players
Augsburger Panther players
Eisbären Berlin players
ERC Ingolstadt players
Löwen Frankfurt players
EHC München players
German ice hockey forwards
Sportspeople from Garmisch-Partenkirchen